El Chapulín Colorado Animado is a Mexican animated series based on the live-action show of the same name, originally created by Roberto Gómez Bolaños. The show is produced by Ánima Estudios, who also produced El Chavo Animado, another animated adaptation of one of Bolaños' works.

The show first premiered on veo.tv, an online platform, on 13 April 2015, and later in television on Televisa-owned networks on 26 July 2017.

See also

El Chapulín Colorado
El Chavo Animado
Ánima Estudios
Chespirito

References

External links
 

2015 Mexican television series debuts
2010s Mexican television series
2010s animated television series
Mexican children's animated adventure television series
Mexican children's animated comic science fiction television series
Canal 5 (Mexico) original programming
Univision original programming
Ánima Estudios television series